The following is a list of Teen Choice Award winners and nominees for Choice Music – Male Artist. Justin Bieber is the most awarded artist in this category  with 6 overall  nominations and 5 awards . Aaron Carter is the youngest winner in 2001 at the age of 13. James Blunt is the oldest winner in 2006 at the age of 32.

Winners and nominees

1999

2000s

2010s

References

Pop music awards
Male Artist